The Central European Zone Rally Championship is an international rally championship which is run by the Austrian-based Oberste Nationale Sportkommission für den Motorsport (OSK) under the auspicies of the FIA and held across several European countries.

There are four separate championships contested under the Central European Zone banner, and unlike other FIA Zone rally series there is no overall champion. The classes are Production Cars (for Group N vehicles), Class 2 (for Super 2000), 2WD (for FIA classes 5 through 10 which includes Super 1600) and Historic. The Historic class is run largely separate from the other three championships with its own calendar, although it does share some events.

Events are held in Hungary, Austria, Croatia, Slovenia, Czech Republic, Poland, Italy, Slovakia and Serbia.

List of events
2014 calendar events, sourced from:

 Miskolc Rally, Hungary
 Wechselland Rallye, Austria
 Delta Rally, Croatia
 Historic Vltava Rallye, Czech Republic
 Rally Saturnus, Slovenia
 Rally Velenje, Slovenia
 Rally Hustopeče, Czech Republic
 Rajd Rzeszowski, Poland
 Rallye Weiz, Austria
 Rally del Friuli Venezia Giulia, Italy
 Rally Košice, Slovakia
 Croatia Rally, Croatia
 Mecsek Rallye, Hungary

Champions

References

External links
 

FIA Zone rally championships
Motorsport in Europe